Sandy Denny and the Strawbs is a compilation album of songs by Sandy Denny and Strawbs. The album is a reworking of tapes recorded by the band in Copenhagen in July 1967. Tracks from those recordings were first released on the Pickwick budget label in 1973 under the name All Our Own Work. The track listing on this album is slightly different and some of the songs have the original string arrangements that also were recorded in 1967.

Track listing

Side one
"Nothing Else Will Do" (Dave Cousins) – 2:25
"Who Knows Where the Time Goes" (Sandy Denny) – 4:09
"How Everyone But Sam Was a Hypocrite" (Cousins) – 2:48
"Sail Away to the Sea" (Cousins) – 3:23
"And You Need Me" (Cousins) – 3:18
"Poor Jimmy Wilson" (Cousins) – 2:35

Side two
"All I Need Is You" (Cousins) – 2:23
"Tell Me What You See in Me" (Cousins) – 3:41
"I've Been My Own Worst Friend" (Cousins) – 2:42
"On My Way" (Cousins) – 3:07
"Two Weeks Last Summer" (Cousins) – 2:06
"Always on My Mind" (Tony Hooper) – 1:53
"Stay awhile With Me" (Cousins) – 2:24

Personnel

Sandy Denny – lead vocals, backing vocals, guitar
Dave Cousins – lead vocals, backing vocals, guitar, banjo
Tony Hooper – lead vocals, backing vocals, guitar
Ron Chesterman – double bass

Additional personnel
Ken Gudmand – drums
Cy Nicklin – sitar

Other

Svend Lundvig - string arrangement on  2, 5, 7, 13

Recording

Recorded in Copenhagen, Denmark 1967.

The liner notes state "The original 1967 sessions" although the liner notes for All Our Own Work wrongly state August 1968. This is a discrepancy as both albums derive from the same source recordings. Joe Boyd writes he and Denny listened to a white label pressing of the album shortly before the release of Sgt. Pepper (June 1967).

Gustav Winckler – producer
Ivar Rosenberg – engineer
Karl Emil Knudsen – co-ordination

Release history

See also
All Our Own Work

References
Sandy Denny and the Strawbs on Strawbsweb
Sandy Denny and the Strawbs on "Sandy Denny - No More Sad Refrains"

Notes

Sandy Denny albums
1991 compilation albums
Strawbs compilation albums
Albums produced by Joe Boyd
Hannibal Records albums

nl:All Our Own Work